Bearing(s) may refer to:
 Bearing (angle), a term for direction
 Bearing (mechanical), a component that separates moving parts and takes a load
 Bridge bearing, a component separating a bridge pier and deck
 Bearing BTS Station in Bangkok
 Bearings (album), by Ronnie Montrose in 2000

See also
 Bering (disambiguation)
 Baring (disambiguation)